The Cape Town Irish Volunteer Rifles were a volunteer part-time military unit, which existed for a few years in late Victorian South Africa.

The unit was formed in Cape Town in 1885, in response to fears of a war between the United Kingdom and Russia. (The  Cape Town Highlanders were formed at the same time, for the same reason).  Thomas O'Reilly, a prominent Irish-born Cape politician, commanded the CTIVR.

The CTIVR was never a large unit (its greatest strength, in 1888, was only 214 all ranks), and in 1891 it was taken over by the  Duke of Edinburgh's Own Volunteer Rifles.

References
Monick, S.  Shamrock and Springbok (1989)

Infantry regiments of South Africa
Defunct Irish regiments of the British Army
Military units and formations established in 1885
Military units and formations of the British Empire
1885 establishments in the Cape Colony